Adesmia argenta is an endemic perennial shrub found in Peru.

References

argentea
Flora of Peru